Abagrotis bimarginalis is a species of cutworm or dart moth in the family Noctuidae. It is found in Central America and North America.

The MONA or Hodges number for Abagrotis bimarginalis is 11017.

References

Further reading

 
 
 
 
 

Abagrotis
Articles created by Qbugbot
Moths described in 1883